The Roundhouse Tapes is a live double album by Swedish progressive metal band Opeth. The CD was recorded on 9 November 2006 and was released on 23 October 2007 in the US, on 5 November in Europe, and on 20 November in the rest of the world. A two-disc DVD version was released on 10 November 2008, and includes exclusive menu music written by Mikael Åkerfeldt and Per Wiberg. The title is a play on the name of Iron Maiden's first release The Soundhouse Tapes, as well as the venue where the record was recorded. Åkerfeldt said, "The Roundhouse concert will always be a very memorable gig for us for many reasons, but most importantly it caught the band at the peak of the Ghost Reveries tour". This is the final Opeth release with Peter Lindgren.

Track listing

The DVD also features fan and band interviews, sound-check footage and a photo gallery of the concert.

Personnel

Opeth
 Mikael Åkerfeldt – guitar, vocals, mixing, direction
 Peter Lindgren – guitar
 Martín Méndez – bass guitar
 Per Wiberg – keyboards, backing vocals
 Martin "Axe" Axenrot – drums

Additional personnel
Jens Bogren – mixing
Travis Smith – cover artwork, album design, model, photography
Heather Elizabeth – photography

Charts

References

Opeth albums
2007 live albums